Zach Hively (born 1985) is a humorist, poet, creative nonfiction author, and publisher. His most recent works include the poetry collections Desert Apocrypha, recipient of the 2022 Reading the West Book Award for poetry, and Wild Expectations. He has written the Fool's Gold humor column since 2014, which has run in various alternative publications in the US American West.

Biography 
Hively was born on September 21, 1985, in Albuquerque, New Mexico. His family remained in Albuquerque, where he was raised. He attended college at the University of New Mexico, graduating in 2007 with a degree in English-Philosophy. He undertook a Fulbright English Teaching Assistantship in Olpe, Germany, after graduation.

He then attended the graduate program in creative writing at Trinity College Dublin's Oscar Wilde Centre. He served as managing editor for the centre's anthology, A Thoroughly Good Blue and graduated with an MPhil in Creative Writing in 2013.

Hively then relocated to Durango, Colorado, where he began writing for the Durango Telegraph as a recurring columnist and reporter. He also contributed to Edible Southwest Colorado, Four Corners Free Press, and Durango Magazine.

Writing 
Hively is an author and artist, known for writing, poetry, and nonfiction. His ongoing column  Fool's Gold has appeared in numerous alternative newspapers, including the Durango Telegraph, the New Mexico Mercury, Four Corners Free Press, and the KC Post. The column has received several nods from the Society of Professional Journalists' Top of the Rockies awards, a regional, multi-platform contest for reporters and news organizations. Fool's Gold earned first place in the Personal/Humor Column category in 2022, 2018, and 2017, and third place in 2021, 2016,  and 2018.  Currently, Fool's Gold publishes monthly in the Durango Telegraph and Four Corners Free Press.

Hively's poetry has been published both internationally and regionally, in publications like Banshee, Trickster, and Conceptions Southwest. His first collection, Wild Expectations, was published in 2020. It is a collaboration between Hively and photographer Magdalena Lily McCarson, pairing the former's poetry with the latter's black and white photography in conversation. The book was listed as a finalist in the Poetry and Art categories in the 2021 New Mexico/Arizona Book Awards.

His follow-up collection, Desert Apocrypha, received the 32nd annual Reading the West Book Award for poetry, after being shortlisted by member bookstores in the Mountains & Plains Independent Booksellers Association. 

Hively has published a number of shorter works as well, including the foreword to V. B. Price's Innocence Regained: Christmas Poems and several short stories. 

Hively is the recipient of a 2021 New Mexico Writers grant to support work on a forthcoming creative nonfiction project. He also earned a Maxwell Medallion from the Dog Writers Association of America in 2018 for his episode on The Raven Narratives podcast, "The Doggie Bucket List."

In addition, Hively is also a singer/songwriter and a musician. He has recorded and toured with the alt-folk duo Oxygen on Embers, which released their debut album Southwest Revival in 2019 after their debut EP, Takes Me Back, in 2018.

Recognition 

 2022 – Winner, 32nd annual Reading the West Book Awards for the poetry collection Desert Apocrypha
 2022 – First place, Society of Professional Journalists Top of the Rockies awards, in the Personal/Humor column category, for Fool's Gold
 2021 – Recipient, New Mexico Writers grant
 2021 – Third place, Society of Professional Journalists Top of the Rockies awards, in the Personal/Humor column category, for Fool's Gold
 2021 – Finalist, New Mexico/Arizona Book Awards, New Mexico Poetry category, for Wild Expectations
 2018 – First place, Society of Professional Journalists Top of the Rockies awards, in the Personal/Humor column category, for Fool's Gold
 2018 – Recipient, Dog Writers Association of America Maxwell Medallion, in the Radio, Podcast, or Other Audio category, for "The Doggie Bucket List" – The Raven Narratives
 2017 – First place, Society of Professional Journalists Top of the Rockies awards, in the Personal/Humor column category, for Fool's Gold
 2016 – Third place, Society of Professional Journalists Top of the Rockies awards, in the Personal/Humor column category, for Fool's Gold

References 

Living people
American male poets
21st-century American poets
Writers from New Mexico
Poets from New Mexico
University of New Mexico alumni
21st-century American male writers
1985 births
Alumni of Trinity College Dublin